Mary Sadler Powell (1854 or 1855 – 8 March 1946) was a New Zealand temperance worker and suffragist.

Life
Powell was born in Gloucestershire, England c. 1854. In 1885 she emigrated to New Zealand, where she lived with her brother. She was active with the Invercargill branch of the Women's Christian Temperance Union New Zealand (WCTU NZ) She served as president of the Invercargill branch, which became the second largest branch of the WCTU in New Zealand. Powell stayed active in the WCTU NZ for over 30 years, working as a corresponding secretary, recording secretary, and organiser. In 1890 she attended her first national convention. In 1900 she attend the WCTU World biennial convention in London, and was made a life member in 1919.

Powell wrote a column promoting the Christian life for young women under the pen name "Aunt Kate" for the New Zealand Methodist. She also supported women's right vote.

Powell never married and she died on 8 March 1946 in Dunedin.

References

1854 births
1946 deaths
English emigrants to New Zealand
New Zealand suffragists
New Zealand temperance activists
People from Gloucester
Woman's Christian Temperance Union people